At least three warships of Japan have borne the name Isonami:

 , a  launched in 1908, re-rated as a minesweeper and renamed W-7 in 1928, she was stricken in 1930
 , a  launched in 1927 and sunk in 1943
 , an  launched in 1957 and stricken in 1987

Japanese Navy ship names
Imperial Japanese Navy ship names